Hans-Dieter Sues (born January 13, 1956) is a German-born American paleontologist who is Senior Scientist and Curator of Vertebrate Paleontology at the National Museum of Natural History of the Smithsonian Institution in Washington, DC.

He received his education at Johannes Gutenberg-Universität Mainz (University of Mainz), University of Alberta, and Harvard University (Ph.D., 1984). Before assuming his present position, Sues worked at the Royal Ontario Museum and the University of Toronto and at the Carnegie Museum of Natural History in Pittsburgh.

He is interested in the diversity, paleoecology, and evolutionary history of Paleozoic and Mesozoic tetrapods, especially archosaurian reptiles and cynodont therapsids, and the history of biology and paleontology. Sues has discovered numerous new dinosaurs and other extinct terrestrial vertebrates in Paleozoic and Mesozoic continental strata in North America and Europe.

He has authored or co-authored over 150 articles and book chapters on vertebrate paleontology and paleoecology. Sues has written The Rise of Reptiles (Johns Hopkins University Press, 2019) and Triassic Life on Land: The Great Transition (with N. C. Fraser; Columbia University Press, 2010). He has edited Evolution of Herbivory in Terrestrial Vertebrates (Cambridge Univ. Press, 2000) and co-edited Terrestrial Ecosystems through Time (with A. K. Behrensmeyer et al.; Univ. of Chicago Press, 1992), In the Shadow of the Dinosaurs: Early Mesozoic Tetrapods (with N. C. Fraser; Cambridge Univ. Press, 1994), Major Transitions in Vertebrate Evolution (with J. S. Anderson; Indiana Univ. Press, 2007), and Terrestrial Conservation Lagerstätten: Windows into the Evolution of Life on Land (with N. C. Fraser; Dunedin Academic Press, 2017). He is also active in promoting the value of natural history collections for addressing major questions in current science.

Sues was elected a Fellow of the Royal Society of Canada in 2003 and a Fellow of the American Association for the Advancement of Science in 1998. The pachycephalosaur Hanssuesia is named for him.

Selected works

See also
Pappochelys
Stygimoloch
Anzu
Daemonosaurus
Afrovenator
Levnesovia
Sarahsaurus
Saurornitholestes
Urbacodon
Zephyrosaurus
Timurlengia

References

American paleontologists
Harvard University alumni
German emigrants to the United States
Living people
Fellows of the Royal Society of Canada
1956 births